Tripp is a city in Hutchinson County, South Dakota, United States. The population was 575 in the 2020 census.

History
Tripp was laid out in 1886, and named in honor of Bartlett Tripp, chief justice of the Dakota Territory Supreme Court. Tripp was incorporated in 1910.

In 2018 Tripp's nursing home closed.

Geography
Tripp is located at  (43.224966, -97.965391).

Demographics

2010 census
As of the census of 2010, there were 647 people, 290 households, and 167 families residing in the city. The racial makeup of the city was 98.5% White, 0.6% Native American, 0.2% Asian, 0.2% from other races, and 0.6% from two or more races. Hispanic or Latino of any race were 1.7% of the population.

There were 290 households, of which 19.7% had children under the age of 18 living with them, 46.2% were married couples living together, 5.5% had a female householder with no husband present, 5.9% had a male householder with no wife present, and 42.4% were non-families. 38.6% of all households were made up of individuals, and 26.2% had someone living alone who was 65 years of age or older. The average household size was 2.06 and the average family size was 2.64.

The median age in the city was 55.2 years. 16.5% of residents were under the age of 18; 3.3% were between the ages of 18 and 24; 18.3% were from 25 to 44; 24.8% were from 45 to 64; and 37.2% were 65 years of age or older. The gender makeup of the city was 48.1% male and 51.9% female.

2000 census
As of the census of 2000, there were 711 people, 321 households, and 183 families residing in the city. The population density was 1,225.8 inhabitants per square mile (473.3/km2). There were 373 housing units at an average density of 643.1 per square mile (248.3/km2). The racial makeup of the city was 98.73% White, 0.42% Native American, 0.28% Asian, and 0.56% from two or more races. Hispanic or Latino of any race were 1.41% of the population.

There were 321 households, out of which 21.2% had children under the age of 18 living with them, 48.9% were married couples living together, 6.2% had a female householder with no husband present, and 42.7% were non-families. 39.3% of all households were made up of individuals, and 24.3% had someone living alone who was 65 years of age or older. The average household size was 2.02 and the average family size was 2.68.

In the city, the population was spread out, with 17.4% under the age of 18, 3.9% from 18 to 24, 19.4% from 25 to 44, 20.1% from 45 to 64, and 39.1% who were 65 years of age or older. The median age was 54 years. For every 100 females, there were 78.6 males. For every 100 females age 18 and over, there were 76.8 males.

The median income for a household in the city was $24,609, and the median income for a family was $34,531. Males had a median income of $26,500 versus $16,397 for females. The per capita income for the city was $16,231. About 13.7% of families and 18.6% of the population were below the poverty line, including 28.6% of those under age 18 and 14.3% of those age 65 or over.

Notable people 

 Caleb Finck, member of the South Dakota House of Representatives
 Jared Reiner, retired NBA player

References

Cities in Hutchinson County, South Dakota
Cities in South Dakota
Populated places established in 1910